The British Nordic Final was a short lived Motorcycle speedway final sanctioned by the FIM as a qualifying round for the Speedway World Championship.

Introduced to the World Championship in the 1966, it served as a qualifying round for the European Final, which was in turn the final qualifying round for the World final. The race consisted of British, Commonwealth and Scandinavian riders but in 1974 riders from the United States also competed. The Intercontinental Final was inaugurated in 1975 effectively replacing this event.

Winners

See also
 Speedway World Championship
 Motorcycle speedway

References